"Moment" is a song by Japanese band SMAP. Released as a single on August 1, 2012, the song was used as the theme song for the Tokyo Broadcasting System Television broadcast of the 2012 Summer Olympics, for which SMAP member Masahiro Nakai was the main sportscaster. It was written by the band Sakanaction's vocalist and songwriter Ichiro Yamaguchi, while the single's B-side "Te o Tsunagō" was written by producer Kenichi Maeyamada. The single was commercially successful, reaching number one on Oricon's singles chart, and was certified gold by the Recording Industry Association of Japan.

Background and development 

Since 2004, SMAP songs had been used by Tokyo Broadcasting System Television to pair with their Olympic Games coverage, with "Susume!" from SMAP 016/MIJ (2004) used for the Athens 2004 Summer Olympics broadcast, and "Kono Toki, Kitto Yume ja Nai" (2008) for the Beijing 2008 Summer Olympics. The band's single "Triangle" (2006) was similarly used by TV Asahi for their broadcasts of the Torino 2006 Winter Olympics and the Vancouver 2010 Winter Olympics.

In 2010, SMAP worked together with Sakanaction member Ichiro Yamaguchi, when he created the song "Magic Time" for their album We Are SMAP!. Sakanaction's most recently released single at the time, "Boku to Hana" (2012), acted as the theme song for the drama 37-sai de Isha ni Natta Boku: Kenshui Junjō Monogatari, in which SMAP member Tsuyoshi Kusanagi starred.

A week after the single was released, the band released their 20th studio album, Gift of SMAP, despite the song not appearing on the album.

Writing and production 

When SMAP's production team asked Yamaguchi to create the song, he did not know if the song was going to be a single or an album song as "Magic Time" had been. Yamaguchi created the song after listening to SMAP's previous singles, attempting to create a medium tempo song that could express the fire in someone's heart. Yamaguchi felt that writing the song had been a learning process for him, as he needed to consider what type of pop music would suit the band and the song from a different perspective to how he wrote pop music for his band Sakanaction. The song's lyrics have a message of encouragement for Olympic athletes. The song is a pop song build on top of fast tempo drums and synthesized string sounds. CDJournal reviewers felt that the song was "overflowing" with a fast pace, feeling it lyrically emphasized the importance of now.

Commercial reception 

The single reached number one on Oricon's weekly singles chart. As this was the band's 48th single top chart in the top ten, this broke the record for a male artist to do so at the time, with SMAP beating rock band B'z record of 47 releases. The song also became the most commercially broadcast theme song for the London Olympics in Japan, surpassing Ikimono-gakari's theme song for the NHK broadcast, "Kaze ga Fuiteiru".

Track listings

Chart rankings

Sales and certifications

Release history

References 

2012 singles
2012 songs
2012 Summer Olympics
Japanese-language songs
Olympic theme songs
Songs written by Ichiro Yamaguchi
Victor Entertainment singles
Billboard Japan Hot 100 number-one singles
Oricon Weekly number-one singles